Hawkshead is a civil parish in the South Lakeland District of Cumbria, England. It contains 68 listed buildings that are recorded in the National Heritage List for England. Of these, one is listed at Grade I, the highest of the three grades, four are at Grade II*, the middle grade, and the others are at Grade II, the lowest grade.  The parish is in the Lake District National Park.  It contains the village of Hawkshead, and the smaller settlements of Hawkshead Hill and Outgate, and the surrounding countryside.  Most of the listed buildings are in Hawkshead village, and include houses, shops, public houses, churches and associated structures, a former grammar school, a town hall, and a telephone kiosk.  Outside the village are more houses, farmhouses, farm buildings, a former mill, bridges, a chapel, an animal pound, a water pump in a shelter, and another telephone kiosk.

Key

Buildings

References

Citations

Sources

Lists of listed buildings in Cumbria